The Great Seal of the Irish Free State is either of two seals affixed to certain classes of official documents of the Irish Free State (Saorstát Éireann): 
 the "internal" Great Seal, used from 1925 for "internal" documents (of domestic law) signed by the Governor-General 
 the "external" Great Seal, used from 1932 for diplomatic documents signed by the British king. 
A new seal, for documents signed by the President of Ireland, replaced the internal seal in 1937, when the Constitution of Ireland came into force; it replaced the external seal in 1949 when the Republic of Ireland Act came into force.

Internal Great Seal
The Great Seal of Ireland was used in the English king's Lordship of Ireland, which in 1534 became the Kingdom of Ireland. The seal was retained by the Acts of Union 1800 for use by the Lord Lieutenant of Ireland in the business of the Dublin Castle administration. The Government of Ireland Act 1920 retained the Lord Lieutenant and Great Seal for use by both Northern Ireland and Southern Ireland. The 1921 Anglo-Irish Treaty envisaged an Irish Free State to replace Southern Ireland, with a Provisional Government and Provisional Parliament until the Free State's constitution was enacted. The draft constitution replaced the Lord Lieutenant with a Governor General but made no explicit mention of the seal.

In August 1922 the Provisional Government's civil servants sought ministerial approval to adopt a seal. It was thought necessary for legal reasons: the treaty and draft constitution specified that the Irish Free State would have the same constitutional status as Canada, which had its own Great Seal since its Confederation in 1867. The letters patent issued on 6 December 1922 constituting the office of Governor-General said:

The wording matched the 1900 letters patent for the Great Seal of the Commonwealth of Australia. The Irish Free State (Consequential Provisions) Act 1922 also created a separate Governor and Great Seal for Northern Ireland.

The physical seal was in theory in the custody of the Governor-General for his personal use; in practice the Executive Council kept and used it.

Design
The Great Seal features an image of a Celtic harp surrounded by Celtic knotwork and the words "SAORSTÁT ÉIREANN" in Gaelic script.  The die comprises an inscribed copper matrix to be placed over the document to be sealed, and a counterpart relief steel patrix to be placed under it.

Regarding the design of the Great Seal, an approach was made by Hugh Kennedy, the Attorney General, to Thomas Sadleir, Registrar of the Office of Arms at Dublin Castle. In his reply Sadlier noted that he was "satisfied that the harp was very early in the 12th century an Irish badge...". The 1919–1922 seal of the revolutionary Dáil of the self-proclaimed Irish Republic showed a harp surrounded by the words "Sigullum Reipublicae Hibernicae — Seala Saorstáit Éireann". By contrast, the 1922 Provisional Government's seal was a quartering of the arms of the four provinces. The Provisional Government's private secretary suggested to Hugh Kennedy a similar seal for the Free State: "If considered desirable to symbolise in the design the present partition of Ulster, this could be done by leaving the Arms incomplete and broken at the corner.". George Sigerson, the President of the National Literary Society, recommended to Tim Healy, the new Governor-General, that the harp should be adopted as the symbol of the Free State. His view was that:

On 28 December 1922 a meeting of the Executive Council of the Irish Free State decided that the Celtic harp should be adopted. The first design submitted to the Royal Mint in England placed the harp in a heraldic shield with crest, but the mint said this would be "a disaster".  In August 1923 the Executive Council determined that the "Brian Ború" harp in Trinity College Dublin, would be the basis of the new seal. Archibald McGoogan of the Art Department of the National Museum perfected the design, and the Royal Mint in January 1924 said it was "delighted" with the revised version.

Final authorisation was given by the Executive Council on 17 October 1924 for the provision of the various seals, including ministerial seals which had the Brian Ború harp circumscribed with "Saorstát Éireann" and the ministerial title in Irish and English. The knotwork was a direct copy of the base of the Ardagh Chalice. McGoogan's original drawing was sold at auction in 2007 for €17,000. Mabel McConnell, from a family of heraldic artists, was contracted by the Executive Council to make the sketches which the Royal Mint in England used to cast the die matrix for the seal. The Colonial Office objected that the design ought to have been pre-approved by the King-in-Council: that is, submitted to the Privy Council of the United Kingdom, which would advise the King to issue an Order in Council for formal approval. In 1925 the Royal Mint fulfilled the commission despite the lack of such an order.

External Great Seal

In 1931, a separate External Great Seal or Royal Great Seal was created to be used on diplomatic documents which required the signature of the monarch in London rather than the Governor-General in Dublin. Up to 1931, such documents had been transmitted to the Dominions Office and the British Great Seal of the Realm was applied alongside the signature. At the 1930 Imperial Conference, the Free State proposed that a Dominion should be allowed to send documents via its High Commissioner in London, bypassing the British government, and to affix its own seal rather than the British one. The conference subcommittee on seals resolved, "The subject should be postponed on the understanding that the whole question should be left for further discussion between Governments should occasion arise". In January 1931 the Free State government tested its proposed procedure; it applied the 1925 Free State seal to the instrument of ratification for a 1929 treaty between the Free State and Portugal, and sent it to High Commissioner John W. Dulanty to transmit to King George V. Dulanty was refused an audience, the British objecting on the grounds that the change in procedure had not been agreed, and that the 1925 seal was not in fact a "great seal" within the terms of the 1922 letters patent, but merely a "private seal of the Governor-General", since it had never been formally approved by the monarch. A compromise was negotiated whereby the Free State would use a separate "external seal" in the custody of its Minister for External Affairs. Although Arthur Berriedale Keith claimed in 1934 that "this drastic change in Commonwealth relations was carried out without any discussion in the British Parliament or intimation by the British Government of the change", in fact Sir William Davison asked J. H. Thomas, the Secretary of State for Dominion Affairs, about it in April 1931; Thomas referred to the Balfour Declaration of 1926.

The external seal, designed by Percy Metcalfe, had on its reverse the same harp image as the 1925 "internal" seal.  It was similar in size to the British Great Seal of the Realm, and had on its obverse the same image of the monarch enthroned as that seal, except for the quartered royal arms above the throne, where the English arms in first and fourth quarters were switched with the Irish arms in third quarter. George V formally presented the external seal to John W. Dulanty on 18 January 1932 at Sandringham House. Keith commented that this marked "the final establishment of the complete international sovereignty of the Free State and the elimination of any British control".

The External Great Seal was used only on ratifications and Full Powers, and not always on the latter.  Lesser seals were used on lesser documents:
 The "Signet Seal" on exequaturs (receiving foreign diplomats) and commissions (appointing Irish diplomats).
 The "Fob Seal" on the back of the envelope enclosing letters of credence or recall
Whereas the UK's Crown Office Act 1877 permits a small wafer Great Seal to replace the cumbersome wax Great Seal, the Free State's wax seal had no wafer equivalent.

The first use of the External Great Seal was not until 1937, when George VI sealed Full Powers allowing Francis T. Cremins to sign the Montreux Convention Regarding the Abolition of the Capitulations in Egypt on behalf of the Free State. Successive governments minimised the use of monarch and the External Great Seal.  The state typically conducted bilateral agreements at inter-government level rather than the nominally more prestigious head-of-state level, so that the Minister for External Affairs would apply his departmental seal to any documents. After signing some multilateral treaties that would have required the External Great Seal for ratification, the state chose instead to wait until the treaty had come into force and then become a party to it by accession rather than ratification, as the internal Great Seal would suffice for accession.

After the Statute of Westminster 1931, following the Free State's lead, the Union of South Africa in 1934 and Canada in 1939 passed laws permitting themselves to use their own Great Seals for diplomatic functions. South Africa, like the Free State, created a new seal for these purposes, whereas Canada simply extended the use of its existing domestic seal.

Supersession
The fact that the Free State was a monarchy rather than a republic was politically controversial, and caused the 1922–23 Irish Civil War. Although the republicans lost the war, Free State leaders sensitive to the controversy gradually abolished the Governor-General's formal powers, or transferred them elsewhere. The Ministers and Secretaries Act 1924 created a separate Executive Council seal, similar to the Great Seal but with  added to the inscription.  When republican Civil War leader  Éamon de Valera became President of the Executive Council after the 1932 Irish election, sidelining the Governor-General accelerated, until the Constitution (Amendment No. 27) Act 1936 abolished the office altogether and transferred its remaining functions to the Executive Council. Rather than using the internal Great Seal in connection with these functions, the Executive Council seal was used. In 1937 de Valera said "I have no idea of what sort of seal that [the internal Great Seal] was. As well as I remember, I never saw a document sealed with it." The die of the internal Free State seal is now on public display at National Museum of Ireland – Decorative Arts and History in Dublin.

Ancilllary to the abolition of the Governor-Generalship, the Executive Authority (External Relations) Act 1936 continued the use of the External Great Seal by the King. The distinction between the two Great Seals was not always clearly understood. In 1932,  Hugh Kennedy, by then Chief Justice, was under the impression that the internal and external seals were in the custody respectively of the Executive Council and Governor-General. The 1937 Constitution of Ireland created the office of President of Ireland, and the Seal of the President was created for the President's formal signature of official documents in the same manner as the internal Free State seal had been used, and having the same design except substituting "Éire" for "Saorstát Éireann", since the constitution had changed the name of the state. The text on the reverse of External Great Seal was changed likewise, and the British monarch, George VI, continued to sign diplomatic documents using it. This dichotomy reflected ambiguity over who was head of state. The Republic of Ireland Act 1948 transferred diplomatic functions to the President, rendering the External Great Seal obsolete.

See also

 Coat of arms of Ireland

Footnotes

References

Sources
Primary

Citations

External links
 Various designs for the Free State Great Seal, created in pen and ink by A. McGoogan in 1923, Hugh Kennedy Papers, UCD archives

Irish Free State
Government in the Irish Free State
Monarchy in the Irish Free State
National symbols of the Republic of Ireland
Governors-General of the Irish Free State
Symbols introduced in 1925